Don Nicholls (born 23 November 1936) is a former Australian rules footballer who played with Carlton in the Victorian Football League (VFL).

The Carlton Football Club recruited Nicholls from the Maryborough Football Club in 1956, the Blues would later sign his younger brother John> Their father ensured that both brothers would play together with one club. Don played 77 senior games as a centreman for Carlton from 1956, when he was Carlton's best first-year player, to 1961.

In 1962 he left Carlton to play for Box Hill.

Notes

External links 

Don Nicholls's profile at Blueseum

1936 births
Carlton Football Club players
Box Hill Football Club players
Living people
Australian rules footballers from Victoria (Australia)
Maryborough Football Club players